Harry John Parsons (born 9 October 2002) is an English professional footballer who plays as a forward for Farnborough on loan from Swindon Town.

Career
In 2011, Parsons joined Swindon Town's academy after trialling with Reading and Swindon, signing a scholarship with the club in 2019. On 13 November 2019, Parsons made his debut for the club in a 1–0 EFL Trophy loss against Bristol Rovers. On 14 May 2021 it was announced that he had been offered a new contract and it was confirmed as signed the following month.

On 12 November 2021, Parsons joined National League South side Chippenham Town on a one-month loan deal. Against the Dorking Wanderers he scored three goals within 7 minutes. On 10 December 2021, the loan was extended for a further month.

On 26 August 2022, Parsons joined National League North club Banbury United on loan until January 2023. Parsons was recalled on 13 October. On 29 October, Parsons returned for a second loan spell with Chippenham Town. In February 2023, he joined Farnborough on loan until the end of the season.

Style of play
Swindon under-18's manager David Farrell has labelled Parsons as "raw" and "a pest" up front.

Career statistics

References

2002 births
Living people
Association football forwards
English footballers
Swindon Town F.C. players
Chippenham Town F.C. players
Banbury United F.C. players
Farnborough F.C. players
English Football League players
National League (English football) players